Tanghai South railway station is a railway station in Caofeidian District, Tangshan, Hebei, China.

Passenger services to Tangshan and Caofeidian East started on 28 December 2018.

References

Railway stations in Hebei
Railway stations in China opened in 2018